Nowbahar (also Romanized as Nowbahār and Naubahār) is a village in Rudbar Rural District, in the Central District of Tafresh County, Markazi Province, Iran. At the 2006 census, its population was 103, in 36 families.

References 

Populated places in Tafresh County